Michael Paul Dare Fava  (born 1962) is a British Catholic priest and former British Army chaplain. From 2018 to 2020, he served as Deputy Chaplain General of the Royal Army Chaplains' Department: he is the first Roman Catholic to hold the post.

Fava entered the Order of Saint Benedict in 1980, and was ordained to the priesthood on 8 July 1989. He was commissioned into the British Army as a chaplain in 1997. In 2004, he moved from the Benedictines to become a secular priest affiliated with the Diocese of Portsmouth. He appointed Deputy Chaplain-General to Her Majesty's Land Forces Army in November 2018, and promoted to the rank of deputy chaplain general (equivalent to brigadier) on 30 June 2019. 

On 5 July 2017, Fava was appointed an Honorary Chaplain to the Queen (QHC). He was appointed Commander of the Order of the British Empire (CBE) in the 2019 Birthday Honours.

Fava retired from the British Army on 30 October 2020. In late 2021, he joined St Joseph's Church, Newbury, Berkshire, in the Diocese of Portsmouth, as parish priest.

References

 

 

1962 births
Living people
20th-century British Roman Catholic priests
Former Benedictines
Royal Army Chaplains' Department officers
Honorary Chaplains to the Queen
Commanders of the Order of the British Empire
British Army brigadiers
21st-century British Roman Catholic priests